The Riverside Historic District, also known as Riverside Landscape Architecture District, encompasses what is arguably one of the first planned communities in the United States. The district encompasses the majority of the village of Riverside, Illinois, a suburb just west of Chicago.  It was planned and designed by Calvert Vaux and Frederick Law Olmsted, and features a number of architecturally distinguished buildings.

History
According to "Riverside in 1871 With a Description of its Improvements", a booklet by The Riverside Improvement Company, The Riverside Improvement Company was established in April, 1869 to build a charming modern suburban neighborhood called "Riverside".  About nine miles from Chicago, Riverside covers about 1,600 acres of land along the Des Plaines River.  Frederick Law Olmsted, designer of Central Park, New York, furnished the plans for Riverside. Riverside village is unique among Chicago suburbs. Throughout the village, winding roads and green areas along the river create a park like setting.

Water Tower in Riverside, IL is designed by Jenney, Schermerhor & Bogart, architects and Engineers. Like the Water Tower in Chicago, the Riverside water tower is also a well-known landmark in the area. It is both a water tank and a decorative element in the village-scape.

The Riverside district includes the streets, parkways, parklands, and historic gas street lighting in the area bounded by 26th St., Harlem and Ogden Aves., the Des Plaines River, and Forbes Rd.  Also included are the many homes and estates designed by architects such as Frank Lloyd Wright, Daniel Burnham, Louis Sullivan, William Le Baron Jenney, Frederick Clarke Withers, and Calvert Vaux. Several homes, such as the F. F. Tomek House and the Coonley House, have individually received National Historic Landmark status.

See also
List of National Historic Landmarks in Illinois
National Register of Historic Places listings in Cook County, Illinois

References

External links
 National Historic Landmarks Riverside page

National Historic Landmarks in Illinois
Riverside, Illinois
Historic districts on the National Register of Historic Places in Illinois
National Register of Historic Places in Cook County, Illinois